United Nations Security Council Resolution 1686, adopted unanimously on June 15, 2006, after recalling previous resolutions concerning Lebanon and the region, including 1373 (2001), 1566 (2004), 1595 (2005), 1636 (2005), 1644 (2005) and 1664 (2006), the Council extended the mandate of the United Nations International Independent Investigation Commission (UNIIIC) investigating the assassination of former Lebanese Prime Minister Rafik Hariri for one year.

The resolution, adopted in a private session, was backed by France and the United States.

Resolution

Observations
The Council reaffirmed its condemnation of the bombing that killed Prime Minister Rafik Hariri and 22 others, as well as other attacks in Lebanon since October 2004. It commended the UNIIIC for its work "under difficult circumstances", and noted that while significant progress had been made, the investigation was not yet complete.

Council members declared their willingness to assist Lebanon in bringing those responsible for the attack to account.

Acts
The Security Council welcomed the report of the UNIIIC and subsequently extended its mandate until June 15, 2007. It supported the Commission's decision to extend its capabilities in order to assist the Lebanese government with investigations into other attacks in Lebanon since October 1, 2004.

Finally, the Council requested the UNIIIC to report quarterly on the progress of the investigation.

See also 
 Assassination of Rafic Hariri
 Lebanon–Syria relations
 List of United Nations Security Council Resolutions 1601 to 1700 (2005–2006)
 Special Tribunal for Lebanon
 United Nations International Independent Investigation Commission

References

External links
 
Text of the Resolution at undocs.org

 1686
 1686
 1686
June 2006 events